Sprucidea is a genus of four crustose lichens in the family Malmideaceae. Similar to the related genus Malmidea, Sprucidea  is characterized by frequently red thalli that contain the secondary compound norsolorinic acid, but differs in the rod-shaped instead of ellipsoid ascospores and in the stalked sporodochia as conidiomata. Sprucidea species are found in rainforest areas in South America and Southeast Asia.

Taxonomy
Sprucidea was circumscribed in 2017 by lichenologists Marcela Cáceres, André Aptroot, and Robert Lücking. S. granulosa and the type species, S. rubropenicillata, were described as new to science, while S. gymnopiperis and  S. penicillata were two proposed new combinations from the genera Malmidea  and Bacidina, respectively.

The genus name of Sprucidea is in honour of Richard Spruce (1817–1893), who was an English botanist specializing in bryology. He was one of the great Victorian botanical explorers.

Description
Sprucidea lichens are corticolous species that inhabit tropical rainforests. They have a crustose thallus, with or without isidia. The hypothallus and to a lesser extent other parts are often coloured with the red pigment norsolorinone. Apothecia are sessile, often becoming convex in shape. The ascospores are rod-shaped (bacillary), and hyaline. Conidia are on stalked sporodochia.

References

Malmideaceae
Lecanorales genera
Lichen genera
Taxa named by André Aptroot
Taxa named by Robert Lücking
Taxa described in 2017